(also anglicised as Divide by Squares or Divide by Box) is a logic puzzle published by Nikoli. As of 2011, two books consisting entirely of Shikaku puzzles has been published by Nikoli.

Rules

Shikaku is played on a rectangular grid. Some of the squares in the grid are numbered. The objective is to divide the grid into rectangular and square pieces such that each piece contains exactly one number, and that number represents the area of the rectangle.

See also
 List of Nikoli puzzle types

External links
 Nikoli's English-language page on Shikaku

Logic puzzles